"The Last Song" is the twenty-fourth single by Dutch girl group Luv', released in 1991 by RCA Records/BMG. It appears on their 1991 album Sincerely Yours.

Song history
After releasing three joyful singles, "Hasta Mañana" (1990), "Jungle Jive" (1991) and "He's My Guy" (1991), RCA Records/BMG decided that the follow-up record to come out would be the pop ballad "The Last Song", composed by Jacques Zwart and his partner, the Luv' singer Marga Scheide. Like any track from the 1991 Sincerely Yours album, Zwart produced the song, surrounded by a team of session musicians (Bert Meulendijk, Eddie Conard, Hans Jansen, Lex Bolderdijk and Ton op 't Hof) who worked with popular Dutch artists (like Bolland & Bolland, Paul de Leeuw, Gordon, Lee Towers, Herman Brood, and Dolly Dots). Moreover, Omar Dupree (a former member of America Gypsy and Band of Gold, famous bands in the Dutch scene in the 1970s and 1980s) recorded background vocals on "The Last Song". 

Despite the participation of the successful above-mentioned musicians, the single flopped and failed to make any chart impact. 

1991 singles
Luv' songs
Songs written by Marga Scheide
1991 songs
RCA Records singles